Rhododendron makinoi, the Makino rhododendron, is a species of flowering plant in the heath family Ericaceae that is native to Japan. The flowers, borne in trusses in spring, are bell-shaped, deep pink in bud and opening pale pink, with red spots on the interior.

In cultivation in the UK Rhododendron makinoi has gained the Royal Horticultural Society’s Award of Garden Merit. It is hardy down to  but requires a sheltered spot in dappled shade, and an acid soil enriched with leaf mould.

References 

makinoi